Natalia Pacierpnik (born 14 August 1988 in Końskie) is a Polish slalom canoeist who has competed at the international level since 2004.

Pacierpnik won a bronze medal in the K1 team event at the 2022 ICF Canoe Slalom World Championships in Augsburg. She also won three medals (2 silvers and 1 bronze) in the K1 team event at the European Championships. At the 2012 Summer Olympics in London she competed in the K1 event, finishing 7th in the final. She finished in 11th place in the same event at the 2016 Summer Olympics in Rio de Janeiro.

World Cup individual podiums

References

External links

 
 
 

1988 births
Living people
Canoeists at the 2012 Summer Olympics
Canoeists at the 2016 Summer Olympics
Olympic canoeists of Poland
People from Końskie County
Polish female canoeists
Sportspeople from Świętokrzyskie Voivodeship
20th-century Polish women
21st-century Polish women
Medalists at the ICF Canoe Slalom World Championships